Expert Review of Anti-infective Therapy is a monthly peer-reviewed medical journal publishing review articles and original papers on all aspects of anti-infective therapy. The journal was established in 2003 and is published by Informa.

Abstracting and indexing
The journal is abstracted and indexed in:

According to the Journal Citation Reports, the journal has a 2014 impact factor of 3.461, ranking it 61st out of 254 journals in the category "Pharmacology & Pharmacy".

References

External links 
 

Microbiology journals
English-language journals
Expert Review journals
Monthly journals
Publications established in 2003